Espin can refer to:
 eCRUSH
 espin (protein)
 Espin (surname)
 Espin (crater) – a lunar crater named after Thomas Henry Espinell Compton Espin